Torstenssonsgatan, Östermalm, Stockholm, Sweden, stretches between  Strandvägen and Storgatan. The street is crossed by Riddargatan. Torstenssonsgatan is a wide and short avenue (about 200 meter) with linden trees. In the extension of the street is The Museum of National Antiquities (Historiska Museet). The street is a not a through street to Strandvägen.

History 
The street is named after Lennart Torstensson, Count of Ortala, Baron of Virestad (17 August 1603 – 7 April 1651), was a Swedish Field Marshal and military engineer.

Streets in Stockholm